HD 34557 is a double star in the northern constellation of Auriga. The fainter star has an angular separation of 0.380″ from the primary component. They have a combined apparent magnitude of 5.52, making HD 34557 faintly visible to the naked eye from dark skies. Based upon parallax measurements made with the Hipparcos satellite, this system is roughly 280 light years away. The primary component is spinning rapidly, with a projected rotational velocity of 217 km/s. It has a stellar classification of A3V, making it an A-type main sequence star.

References

References
HR 1738
Image HD 34557

Auriga (constellation)
A-type main-sequence stars
034557
Double stars
024902
1738
Durchmusterung objects